Izsák can refer to:

 Izsák, Hungary, a Hungarian town
 1546 Izsák, an asteroid named after Imre Izsák
 Izsák Lőwy (1793–1847), a Hungarian industrialist

Izsak can refer to:

 Izsak (crater), a lunar crater named after Imre Izsák
 Imre Izsak (1929–1965), a Hungarian scientist
 Carolina Izsak (born 1971), a Venezuelan beauty queen
 Meir ben Izsak Eisenstadt (1670–1744), a Jewish rabbi

See also
 Izak (surname), also spelled Izaak, Izhak, Itzchak, Itzik, etc.